This is a list of comets designated with X/ prefix. The majority of these comets were discovered before the invention of the telescope in 1610, and as such there was nobody to plot the positions of the comets to a high enough precision to generate any meaningful orbit. Later comets, observed in the 17th century or later, either did not have enough observations, sometimes as few as one or two, or the comet disintegrated or moved out of a favorable location in the sky before it was possible to make more observations of it.

References 
 Maik Meyer. Catalogue of Comet Discoveries

External links 
 PDS Comet Catalog

No meaningful orbit